Sleepless Nights and City Lights is a live compilation album and DVD by Australian metalcore band I Killed the Prom Queen, released through Stomp Entertainment on 22 November 2008. The album featured the first live tracks released by I Killed the Prom Queen, excluding the bonus tracks available on the tour edition of Music for the Recently Deceased.

The DVD features the band in front of their hometown crowd at the HQ's in Adelaide, during their final tour, the 2008 Say Goodbye Tour. They performed songs from all of their releases, with the tour bringing the return of former vocalist Michael Crafter. The DVD contains interviews with each band member, discussing their experiences within I Killed the Prom Queen and the possibility of a return. The initial pressing of the DVD came with a live CD recorded at the Hifi Bar in Melbourne and a tour laminate. The original release of the DVD was set for a September release, but was delayed, then was set for an 8 November release, but once again it was delayed due to classification issues. The album was eventually released on 22 November 2008 and 17 March 2009 in the U.S.It is rated MA15+ for Alcohol Abuse.

Track listing

Personnel
I Killed the Prom Queen
Michael Crafter – lead vocals
Jona Weinhofen – lead guitar, clean vocals
Kevin Cameron – rhythm guitar
Sean Kennedy – bass
JJ Peters – drums

Additional
Tim Bates – mixing
Roman Koester – mixing
Joe Whyte – cover art

Charts

References

I Killed the Prom Queen albums
2008 compilation albums
2008 live albums
2008 video albums
Live video albums